Tulipanin is an anthocyanin. It is the 3-O-rutinoside of delphinidin. It can be found in Alstroemeria spp., Berberis spp., Cissus sicyoides, Hymenocallis spp., Manihot utilissima, Meliosma tenuis, Musa acuminata, Ophiopogon japonicus, Petunia exserta, Petunia reitzii, blackcurrant (Ribes nigrum), Schismatoglottis concinna, Secale cereale, Solanum betaceum, Thaumatococcus daniellii, Tulipa spp and in eggplants.

References 
 

Anthocyanin rutinosides